Dissolophodes is a genus of moths in the family Geometridae. It contains only one species, Dissolophodes curvimacula, which is found on New Guinea.

References

External links

Moths described in 1906
Eupitheciini
Taxa named by William Warren (entomologist)
Moth genera